KFIO may refer to:

 KFIO (AM), a radio station (1050 AM) licensed to serve Dishman, Washington, United States
 KSBN (AM), a radio station (1230 AM) licensed to serve Spokane, Washington, United States which held this call sign from 1927 to 1950